Varagunavarman II, also described as Varaguna II, was a king of the Pandya dynasty in south India whose reign lasted from c. 862 until c. 879 CE. Varaguna II was famously defeated by a contingent of troops led by Pallava king Aparajita around 879 CE.

Background 
Srimara Srivallabha (r. c. 815—862 AD), the predecessor of Varaguna II, was defeated by the Rashtrakuta king Amoghavarsha (the battle of Arisil). Madurai was then sacked by the forces of the Lankan ruler Sena II. Maya Pandya was installed on the Pandya throne by the Sri Lankan army commanders.

Battle of Sri Purambiyam 
Varaguna tried to check the Pallava influence by marching north (and even crossing the Kaveri in the Chola country by c. 879 AD). The northern expedition may well have been directed against the rising power of the Cholas.

A decisive battle was fought at Sri Purambiyam (Tiruppurambiyam near Kumbakonam) in c. 880 AD. An alliance led by the Pallava Aparajita, supported by Chola Aditya I and Ganga Prithvipati I, opposed and defeated the Pandya king (although Prithvipati I lost his life in the battle). The Pandya advance was rolled back. The Chola king subsequently invaded the Pallava country and defeated Aparajita.

Varaguna was succeeded by his younger brother Parantaka Viranarayana around 880 AD.

References

Pandyan kings
880 deaths
Year of birth unknown
9th-century Indian monarchs